Madhurey is a 2004 Indian Tamil-language action comedy film directed by Ramana Madhesh. It stars Vijay, Sonia Agarwal and Rakshitha while Vadivelu, Pasupathy, Seetha, and Tejashree play supporting roles. The film released on 29 August 2004. It received mixed reviews and was a commercial success.

Plot
Madhuravel works as a vegetable vendor with his friend Pandu. He is a do-gooder and protector of the family of Kamatchi and her two daughters. Madurey eradicates loan sharks and fights "bad guys" in the market. Meanwhile, Anitha has a liking towards Madurey and manages to win him over from Maheshwari. One day, while Madhurey was fighting some goons, a goon attempts to throw a briefcase at Madurey, but it falls. When the briefcase opens, Kamakshi finds a newspaper with Madurey and her daughter Susheela's photos in it. She then shoots Madurey, and he is hospitalized. At the hospital, when Kamakshi questions Pandu about how he can be an accomplice to someone who she thought was a murderer, he asks her if he knows who Madurey really is.

The story shifts to a flashback, where Madurey is the district collector of Madurai, with Susheela and Pandu as his assistants. He is the action-packed bureaucrat who takes to the streets to solve the citizens' problems. He does the job of policing and is up against criminals. He does not believe in IPS and police force to clean up the city. So one such clean up operation takes him to KTR, a don who is running a parallel law enforcement system with his own court. He doles out justice to all and is God to the ordinary. Madurey does not take lightly to this parallel outfit. A clash takes place, and Susheela is killed in a fight between Madurey and KTR. KTR puts the blame on Madurey.

Now, Madurey goes undercover to surface as a vegetable vendor because his aim is to pin down KTR. From now onwards, it is Madurey on a rampage until KTR is finished and the murder charge is removed forms rest of the plot.

Cast

Production

Development

R. Madhesh, an assistant of director S. Shankar, was initially assigned to direct Jai with Prashanth, However, after filming a song featuring Prashanth and lead actress Simran, he left the project and began work on another film Madurey. For the character of vegetable seller, Vijay prepared himself by observing real-life vegetable sellers from Koyambedu.

Casting
Simran  and Jyothika were earlier selected as the lead actresses of the film but both were replaced by Sonia Agarwal and Rakshitha respectively while Tejashree who earlier appeared in Ottran was selected to appear in a cameo appearance. The supporting cast has Vadivel, Ilavarasu, Murthy, Seetha and Rajkapoor.

Filming
The set resembling vegetable market designed by Rajeevan was erected on a five-acre land opposite Ponniyamman Kovil, at Saligramam, Chennai. The set which cost around 16 crore consisting of a garden, marketplace, fish-market, flower shop, lorry stand, cinema theatre, temple, church, railway line, housing colony and slum, most of the film's shooting was done on that set.

Music

Soundtrack was composed by Vidyasagar.

One song " Varanda Varanda" is included only in the screen and not in the audio disc separately.

Reception
Ananda Vikatan rated the film 39 out of 100. Malathi Rangarajan of The Hindu wrote that "It isn't just a question of pace — cohesiveness is what is missing in "Madhura". Malini Mannath of Chennai Online noted that "Producing, scripting and directing it, he seems to have concentrated more on the glamour and the frills, alternating action with dance numbers, and missing out on a coherent script". Visual Dasan of Kalki called it a "chocolate pill" for Vijay's fans.

References

External links
 

2004 films
Films shot in Madurai
Indian action films
2000s Tamil-language films
Indian action drama films
2000s masala films
Films scored by Vidyasagar
2004 directorial debut films
2004 action films